Georgy Nikolaevich Rykovanov (born February 9, 1954, in Vologda) – is a Soviet and Russian nuclear physicist, an organizer of science, a Doctor of Physics and Mathematics (1998), an Academician of the Russian Academy of Sciences (2011), and a Hero of Labor of the Russian Federation (2020).

Biography 
In 1969, Rykovanov entered the specialized boarding school # 45 at Leningrad State University, and in 1971 he graduated. In 1977 he graduated from Moscow Engineering Physics Institute.

In 1977, he began working at the All-Union Scientific Research Institute of Technical Physics (now RFNC-VNIITF named after Academician E. I. Zababakhin). In 1995, he became the head of the theoretical department; in 1996 – deputy scientific advisor and head of the theoretical department; in 1998 – first deputy director, first deputy scientific supervisor and head of the theoretical department. From 1998 to 2012 he was Director of RFNC-VNIITF (dismissed at his own request.) Beginning May 31, 2012, his title was Scientific Director of RFNC-VNIITF.

He is the author of over 350 scientific papers. His scientific interests are in the field of nuclear energy and the development of nuclear weapons, proceedings on hydrodynamics, turbulence, detonation, physics of thermonuclear fusion, physics of high energy densities, extreme states of matter, and the development of laser and optoelectronic systems. He proposed an empirical model of the kinetics of detonation of low-sensitivity explosives. He is a participant in the development of nuclear production prototypes in service with the Russian Armed Forces.

In 2003, he was elected a corresponding member of the Russian Academy of Sciences in the Department of Energy, Mechanical Engineering, Mechanics and Control Processes of RAS. In 2011, he was elected a full member of the Russian Academy of Sciences.

Awards 
 2020 – Hero of Labour of the Russian Federation 
 2005 – Order "For Merit to the Fatherland" IV class 
 2015 – Order of Alexander Nevsky
 1985 – Order of the Badge of Honour 
 2002, 2009 – State Prize of the Russian Federation 
 2018 – Honorary Citizen of the Chelyabinsk Region

References

External links 
 Tea Party at the Academy: Keepers of the Nuclear Shield — interview with G. N. Rykovanov on the site "Pravda.ru"
 Georgy Nikolaevich Rykovanov- Heroes of the country.
 Georgy Nikolaevich Rykovanov – The Great Russian Encyclopedia.

1954 births
Full Members of the Russian Academy of Sciences
Recipients of the Order "For Merit to the Fatherland", 4th class
State Prize of the Russian Federation laureates
Soviet physicists
Russian physicists
Moscow Engineering Physics Institute alumni
Living people